L'Ours et la Lune (English: The Bear and the Moon) is a play by Paul Claudel, written in April 1917.

References

French plays
Ours et la lune